Émile Veinante (12 June 1907 – 18 November 1983) was a French football player and coach. A striker, he represented FC Metz and RC Paris at club level while scoring 14 goals in 24 appearances with the France national team.

Club career
Veinante was born in Metz. Primarily a forward, he began his club career in 1916 with the youth squad at FC Metz, which was at that time (before the end of the First World War) still in German-controlled Alsace-Lorraine. He stayed with FC Metz until 1929, when he moved to Racing Club de Paris in the French first division from 1929–1940, with whom he won the French double in 1936, winning the national championship and the cup title. He was named French player of the year in that year. He retired from professional club soccer in 1940.

International career
Between February 1929 and January 1940 Veinante played 24 international matches for the France national team, scoring 14 goals. He appeared in the 1930 and 1938 World Cups, and as a reserve in 1934. In 1938, against Belgium, he scored a goal in the first minute of play.

Managerial career
In 1940 Veinante became manager of Racing Paris, until 1943. He also managed RC Strasbourg Alsace from 1945 to 1947 and in 1948–49, OGC Nice in 1949–50, FC Metz in 1950–51, FC Nantes from 1951 to 1955, and RC Strasbourg again in 1960–61.

Death
He died in 1983 in Dury, Somme.

References

External links
 

1907 births
1983 deaths
People from Alsace-Lorraine
Footballers from Metz
Association football forwards
French footballers
France international footballers
FC Metz players
Racing Club de France Football players
Ligue 1 players
1930 FIFA World Cup players
1934 FIFA World Cup players
1938 FIFA World Cup players
French football managers
RC Strasbourg Alsace managers
OGC Nice managers
FC Metz managers
FC Nantes managers
Racing Club de France Football managers